Farhad Mehrad (20 January 1944 – 31 August 2002), commonly known as Farhad, was an Iranian pop, rock, and folk singer, songwriter, guitarist and pianist, who released the first English rock and roll album in Iran. 
He rose to prominence among Iranian rock, folk and pop musicians before the Islamic Revolution in 1979, but after the revolution, he was banned from singing for several years in Iran. His first concert after the Islamic Revolution was held in 1993. To this day, he is considered one of the most influential and respected contemporary Iranian singers. He was also the first singer of the popular band Black Cats.

Farhad is most well known for his song Jomeh (Friday) for the film Khodahafez Rafigh in 1971. Despite all the rumors about it being a political song written by Shahyar Ghanbari who denied these Allegations on Tapesh TVs "Uncut" Show.

Early life

Farhad was born on 20 January 1944 in Tehran, Iran. His father was Reza Mehrad, an Iranian diplomat who worked in the Arabic countries for the Iranian Ministry of Foreign Affairs. Being the youngest child, he always behaved differently from his family members and everyone assumed he was trying to act like an adult.

When Farhad was three years of age, his love for music was noticed when he stayed outside his brother's room, listening to his violin lessons. His family bought Farhad a cello and he started taking lessons. After three lessons, his cello broke and, as Farhad describes, "the instrument broke into pieces so did my soul". That was the end of the cello for Farhad and his love and passion for music ended up to be only listening to his brother playing the violin.

When he went to school he found a passion for literature. He decided to study literature in high school but with the absence of his father, his uncle forced him to study science despite his weak results on all other subjects other than literature and English language. His interest being ignored, he quit high school in grade 11 because he had no love for what he was studying.

Career

First band
After quitting high school, he met an Armenian music band, The Four Elfs. Using their instruments, he learned music by experience and after a while, he became the guitar player in the band. The band went to southern Iran to perform for the Iranian Oil Company Club – one of the biggest organizations in Iran, with many foreign employees. Before the start of the first night's performance, the band decided that Farhad would be the singer, because of the vocalist's absence.

Farhad's attention and fuss for correct pronunciation of the words, and his knowledge of world literature, came as a good advantage; when he performed a few songs in Italian, French and English, it was hard to believe his mother tongue was Persian. That led to the band's success and they performed for an extended number of nights.

After a while, Farhad quit the band and started his solo career. In 1964, he performed a few English songs on an Iranian TV show, where he captured the attention of more people.

Later, in an event sponsored by Etelat Javanan, a popular youth magazine, he performed in Amjadieh Stadium. He played a few songs with the guitar which was followed by a huge crowd response. That was when Shahbal Shabpareh, the frontman of the Iranian popular band Black Cats heard about Farhad.

Black Cats

In 1967, sometime later after Shahbal and Farhad met, Farhad joined the Black Cats as a vocalist, guitar player and piano player. The Black Cats members were Shahbal Shabpareh (percussion), Shahram Shabpareh (guitar), Hassan Shamaizadeh (saxophone), Homayoun Khajehnouri (guitar), and Manouchehr Eslami (trumpet). The band started playing in the Couchini Club.

Manouchehr Eslami called Farhad the most important member of the band, saying:

{{Quote|"Despite the fact that he couldn't read music sheets and had learned the music by listening and playing by experience, Farhad did not need to attend the practice sessions. By whispering the song a few times, he could synchronize his voice and instrument with the other band members. In fact, he attended the sessions only for the respect of other band members".}}

In the busiest and most successful time of the band, the first Persian song of Farhad, called Age Ye Jo Shaans Daashti ("With a Little Bit of Luck"), was used in dubbing the movie Banooye Zibaye Man (My Fair Lady) into Persian.

After a while, Farhad left the Black Cats to take care of his sick sister in England. Farhad met a famous producer and he was offered a record deal by him. Farhad became ill and due to his illness and personal problems, the deal never took place. The journey which was supposed to last for two months, took one year.

1969–1974

In 1969, Farhad sang "Marde Tanha" ("A Lonely Man") for the movie Reza Motori (Reza, the Biker). The song was composed by Esfandyar Monfaredzadeh and the lyrics were written by Shahyar Ghanbari. After the release of the movie, the song was released on gramophone record and Farhad became a well-known singer.

Farhad only sang songs which had a message and he believed in their messages. That's why after "Marde Tanha" he only released three singles during the period from 1971 until 1973. Those were "Jomeh" ("Friday"), "Hafteye Khakestari" ("The Grey Week") and "Ayeneha" ("Mirrors").

Farhad dedicated the song "Shabaneh" to Sadegh Solhizadeh, M.D., the doctor who helped him overcoming his addiction.

During the revolution

Before the 1979 Iranian Revolution and during the political conflicts of the 1970s in Iran, Farhad recorded six songs with revolutionary messages that became the Iranian's voice of unity.

The day after the Iranian revolution, 11 February 1979, his song "Vahdat" ("Unity") was broadcast on the Iranian television in honor of revolution and freedom.

After the revolution
After the revolution, the Islamic government turned its back on Farhad and refused to grant him permission to publish his album many times. Even the song "Vahdat", which was once considered a song in honor of the revolution, was refused permission to be released. The government's reason was not the song itself, but rather the fact was that the Islamic Government was concerned about his popularity and his influence on people. The government wished Farhad to be forgotten.

Meanwhile, someone with strong connections within the Islamic government obtained official permission from the Ministry of Culture and Islamic Guidance, and released Farhad's singles which were recorded before the revolution, as an album without Farhad's permission. He called the album Vahdat (Unity). Many Iranians bought the album to keep the memory of Farhad and his remarkable songs alive.

Comeback
In 1993, after 15 years of silence, Farhad was granted permission to release his first album, Khab Dar Bidari ("Sleep while Awake"), and it went straight to the top of the charts just after its release.

After this album, Farhad lost hope in the Iranian government's grant of permission system and he released his next album Barf ("Snow") in the United States in 1999. Barf was released in Iran a year later.

Last album
After Barf, Farhad decided to record an album with songs from different countries and in different languages. He decided to call the album Amin (Amen); he started recording but died before he could finish the album.

Death

In September 2000, after two years of treatment in Iran and France, Farhad's illness became serious. On 31 August 2002, he died of a malignant form of hepatitis C in Paris.

His funeral was attended by many Iranian stars like Dariush, Ebi and Persian entertainers. Iranian lyricist Shahyar Ghanbari said that part of him died with Farhad. Farid Zoland said he was devastated by Farhad's death. Ebi said that he lost his best friend and favorite singer.

Farhad is buried in the Cimetière de Thiais (Division:110 Ligne:7 N de la tombe:23), just outside Paris. After his death, a museum of his personal items was founded at cinema-museum in Tehran, Iran, and also two documentaries, Farhad's Fridays and Snow, have been made about him.

Discography

Studio albums
 Khab Dar Bidari (1993) 
 Barf (2000)
 Amin''

Singles (in English)
Mehrad also sang many other English songs and in other languages, but only these songs were recorded.

Take Five
Yesterday
I Put a Spell on You
 Come Down Jesus
Sad Lisa
 Romance of Love
Sunrise/Sunset
When the Sun Comes Down
Unchain My Heart
 Yesterday When I Was Young
Don't Cry for Me Argentina
Let It Be
 Master Song
Alone Again (Naturally)
You've Got a Friend
Unchained Melody
California Dreamin'
Like a Sad Song
 Suzanne
 Windmills of Your Mind
 Everybody's Talking at Me
 Together Again
 Don't Let Me Be Misunderstood
 Sympathy
 Love's Been Good to Me
Solitary Man
 Moment to Moment
Hey, That's No Way to Say Goodbye
 Handyman
 You Won't Love Me
If You Go Away
 I Call You
 I'll Be There
Hurt
 Walking Alone
Eleanor Rigby
Japan Allspice (mixed in English and Persian)
 Good Fantasist (mixed in English and Persian)

Other languages songs
Qui? (French song)
Romanian song (A difficult song with whistle)
Temnaya noch (Russian song)
An die Freude (German song)
Nadie me quiere (Spanish song)
Si je vivrai (French song)
No pal (Armenian song)

Filmography
Music department
 Keep the Flight in Mind (2012, Documentary) - singer as Farha
 Mahiha Dar khak Mimirand (1977) singer as Farhad
 Goodbye Friend (1971) singer as Farhad
 Reza Motorcyclist (1970) singer as Farhad

See also 
 Iranian rock
 List of Iranian musicians

References

External links
 
 
 
 Farhad's House Festival

1944 births
2002 deaths
Iranian pop singers
Iranian rock musicians
20th-century Iranian male singers
Iranian singer-songwriters
Iranian guitarists
Iranian pianists
Male pianists
20th-century pianists
20th-century guitarists
Musicians from Tehran
Deaths from hepatitis